The Sparviero class, also known as the Nibbio class, are small hydrofoil missile boats capable of traveling at speeds of . They were designed for and formerly used by the Italian Navy. The Japanese 1-go class missile boat is an updated version formerly used by the Japan Maritime Self-Defense Force (JMSDF).

History

Italy
The Sparviero-class fast attack hydrofoil was designed in Italy by the Alinavi society, a consortium of the American company Boeing, the Italian government's naval research branch, and Carlo Rodriguez, a Messina-based builder of commercial hydrofoils, based on Boeing's  for the United States Navy. A prototype, named Sparviero was ordered in 1970 for the Italian Navy, Sparviero was laid down by Alinavi in La Spezia in April 1971, was launched on 9 May 1973 and commissioned into Italian service on 15 July 1974.

The design used the Boeing Jetfoil system, with one hydrofoil forward and two aft, which folded out of the water when cruising. The boat was propelled at high speeds by a Rolls-Royce Proteus gas turbine driving a water jet, while a diesel engine driving a retractable propeller powered the boat at low speeds. The hull and superstructure were constructed entirely of aluminium. As the design was intended for short-range, high speed operations, no sleeping accommodation was fitted. Armament consisted of two Otomat anti-ship missiles aft and a single Oto Melara  rapid-fire gun forward.

It was planned in 1974–1975 to order four more Sparviero-class hydrofoils, to be supplemented by at least two larger s, but plans for a NATO-wide standardisation on the Pegasus class were abandoned. When orders were finally placed in 1977, they were for six more Sparvieros (giving seven in total) and no Pegasus-class boats. The new boats, built by Fincantieri at Muggiano, entered service from 1982 to 1984, and differed from the prototype in having a more advanced installation for the Otomat missiles (using the Teseo control system) and having water injection fitted to the gas turbines.

The class proved to be underpowered, and it was hoped to re-engine them with more powerful Alison gas turbines, but these plans were later abandoned. All of the Italian boats have now been decommissioned.

Japan
The Japan Maritime Self-Defense Force (JMSDF) selected a modified version of the Sparviero class as a replacement for its s. A license agreement was signed in 1991 to build up to 12 Sparvieros, with the first two approved in FY90 and both were laid down by Sumitomo in Uraga on 25 March 1991. An order for a third boat was delayed to help pay for Japan's contribution to the Gulf War, with it not being laid down until 1993. A request for a fourth boat under the FY 95 budget was rejected, and plans for further hydrofoils abandoned.

The Japanese chose different armament than used in the Italian boats, with up to four Type 90 Ship-to-Ship Missiles replacing the Otomats and a non-stabilised  M61 Vulcan rotary cannon replacing the larger Oto Melara gun. The main powerplant is a  General Electric LM500 gas turbine.

Military use
Italian boats have all been decommissioned. The Sparviero class was used by the Japanese coastal patrol forces as a fast attack interceptor.

Ships in class

Italy
(All decommissioned)

Japan
(All currently decommissioned, but may be reactivated in near future [2014])

See also 
 , a Canadian hydrofoil intended for anti-submarine duties
 , a Royal Navy Jetfoil mine countermeasure vessel.
 , a class of Soviet PHM
 , a class of Soviet PHM

References 

 Baker, A.D. The Naval Institute Guide to Combat Fleets of the World 1998–1999. Annapolis, Maryland, USA: Naval Institute Press, 1998. .
 Gardiner, Robert and Stephen Chumbley. Conway's All The World's Fighting Ships 1947–1995. Annapolis, Maryland USA: Naval Institute Press, 1995. .
 Moore, John. Jane's Fighting Ships 1985–86. London: Jane's Yearbooks, 1985. .
 Prézelin, Bernard and Baker, A.D. The Naval Institute Guide to Combat Fleets of the World 1990/1991. Annapolis, Maryland, USA: Naval Institute Press, 1990. .
 Saunders, Stephen (RN) Jane's Fighting Ships 2003-2004 

Hydrofoils
Missile boats
Ships built in Italy
Ships built in Japan
Marina Militare
Ships of the Japan Maritime Self-Defense Force
Patrol boat classes